Mert Kuyucu (born 11 May 2000) is a German professional footballer who plays as a defender for Turkish club Manisa.

Career
Having made his debut for FC St. Pauli II in the 2018–19 season, he made his first team debut for FC St. Pauli on 8 December 2019, in a 1–0 defeat away at Jahn Regensburg.

Personal life
Born in Germany, Kuyucu is of Turkish descent.

Career statistics

References

2000 births
German people of Turkish descent
Living people
German footballers
Association football defenders
FC St. Pauli players
FC St. Pauli II players
1. FC Köln II players
Manisa FK footballers
Regionalliga players
2. Bundesliga players
TFF First League players
German expatriate footballers
Expatriate footballers in Turkey
German expatriate sportspeople in Turkey